In economics, a budget set, or the opportunity set facing a consumer, is the set of all possible consumption bundles that the consumer can afford taking as given the prices of commodities available to the consumer and the consumer's income. Thus, for commodity amounts , also known as consumption plans which should not exceed the income, with associated prices  and consumer income , the budget set is defined as
,
where the consumption set is taken to be .

The budget set is bounded above by a -dimensional budget hyperplane characterized by the equation , which in the two-good case corresponds to the budget line. Graphically, the budget set is the subset of  that contains all the consumption bundles that lie on or below the budget hyperplane.

Given the framework described above, it can be shown that Walrasian budget sets are convex and compact.

Other sources of wealth, including stocks, savings, pensions, profit shares, etc., are not included in the income described above. The income described above are also known as initial wealth. 

The demand set  is the set that the consumer chooses to go with based on the preferences from the budget set.

References

Set
Consumer theory